Give Me All Your Loving or similar may refer to:

"Give Me All Your Loving", a song by Sunforest from Sound of Sunforest
"Give Me All Your Lovin, a song by 3T from Brotherhood
"Give Me All Your Lovin, a song by The Fabulous Thunderbirds from Butt Rockin'
"Give Me All Your Luvin', a song by Madonna
"Gimme All Your Lovin', a song by ZZ Top

See also
"Gimme All Your Lovin' or I Will Kill You", a song by Macy Gray
Give Me All Your Love (disambiguation)